Lawsonella clevelandensis is a species of Actinomycetota.

References

Mycobacteriales
Bacteria families